Kimberly Aileen Scott is an American actress. She received a Tony Award for Best Featured Actress in a Play nomination for her performance in the 1988 play Joe Turner's Come and Gone. Scott later appeared in films including The Abyss (1989), Flatliners (1990), Batman Forever (1995), Batman & Robin (1997), K-PAX (2001) and Respect (2020).

Life and career
Scott was born in Kingsville, Texas.  She attended Texas A&M University-Kingsville and the University of Texas before earning an MFA in 1987 from the Yale School of Drama. In 1988, she was nominated for a Tony Award and a Drama Desk Award for Best Featured Actress in a Play for August Wilson's Joe Turner's Come and Gone.

Scott has appeared in films such as The Abyss, Gross Anatomy,  The Waterdance, Drop Zone, The Velocity of Gary, K-PAX, I Am Sam, Impostor, The United States of Leland, Guess Who, World Trade Center and Love & Other Drugs. She frequently appears in the films of Joel Schumacher such as Flatliners, Falling Down and The Client.  She is the only actress to appear in Batman films (Batman Forever and Batman & Robin) as different characters.

Scott has also appeared in the television shows MacGyver, Boy Meets World, The Commish, Family Dog, ER, Chicago Hope, Malibu Shores, 3rd Rock from the Sun, JAG, Sister, Sister, The Practice, NYPD Blue, Touched by an Angel, Once and Again, Soul Food, Family Law, Providence, Will & Grace, Wonderfalls, 7th Heaven, and Medium.

In 2007, she appeared in the short films Sponsored By, Under The Gun, Open House, and Time Upon A Once that were made during the reality show On the Lot.

In 2010, she appeared as Mama Nadi in the Oregon Shakespeare Festival's version of Ruined by playwright Lynn Nottage, in 2011, she played tavern owner Mistress Quickly in Shakespeare's Henry IV, Part Two, and in 2018, she played Pistol, Sir Thomas Grey, and the Governor of Harfleur in “Henry V”.

On October 7, 2016, Scott participated in a Yale University panel discussion, “50 Years of Yale Rep: A Conversation with Theatre Makers Present at the Creation, Along the Way, and Today.”

Filmography

Film

Television

References

External links
 
 Kimberly Scott at The Oregon Shakespeare Festival
Kimberly Scott personal website

American film actresses
Living people
Actresses from Texas
Yale School of Drama alumni
African-American actresses
American television actresses
University of Texas alumni
Texas A&M University alumni
20th-century American actresses
21st-century American actresses
People from Kingsville, Texas
20th-century African-American women
20th-century African-American people
21st-century African-American women
21st-century African-American people
Year of birth missing (living people)